Malephora lutea is a species of plants in the family Aizoaceae (stone plants). They are succulent plants. Flowers are visited by Fidelia kobrowi.

Sources

References 

Aizoaceae
Flora of Malta